Museums in the Cocos (Keeling) Islands include:

 Big Barge Arts Centre
Home Island Visitor Centre & Museum

References 

Cocos (Keeling) Islands
 
Cocos (Keeling) Islands
Museums
Cocos